The River Yarrow may refer to:

 River Yarrow (Lancashire), a river in the north west of England
 Yarrow River, a river of the state of New South Wales in Australia
 Yarrow Water, a river in the Borders in the south east of Scotland